Black Stork in a Landscape is an 18th-century watercolor painting of a woolly-necked stork. The painting, which is currently in the collection the Metropolitan Museum of Art, was commissioned by Claude Martin as part of a series of 658 ornithological paintings.

Description 
The painting depicts a Woolly-necked stork (Ciconia episcopus), a large wading bird that includes the Indian subcontinent in its range. Done in watercolor on European paper, the work was produced by an unknown Indian artist, in what is known as the Company style. The work is traceable to a series of 658 paintings of birds that the French-born Major-General Claude Martin commissioned for his private collection.

The way in which the painting is executed implies that the anonymous author was familiar with the Woolly-necked stork; notably, the stork is shown to be crossing its right foot over its left, the standard posture of a stork.

References 

Paintings in the collection of the Metropolitan Museum of Art
Indian paintings
Watercolor paintings
Birds in art